Beglov is a Russian masculine surname, its feminine counterpart is Beglova. Notable people with the surname include:
                        
Alexander Beglov (born 1956), Russian politician
Elena Beglova (born 1987), Russian basketball player

Russian-language surnames